William Edwin "Chip" Connor II (born 1949) is a Japanese-born Hong Kong-based American businessman and car collector.

Early life
Connor was born in 1949. His father, William E. Connor, started the eponymous William E. Connor & Associates in Japan in 1949 after the Second World War. According to Tatler, Connor "took over the family business in Tokyo in the mid-1980s", and moved the company's headquarters to Hong Kong in 1985.

Connor has an MBA from the University of Southern California and a JD from the University of Santa Clara.

Career
Connor is the Chairman and CEO of William E. Connor and Associates. In 2013 Forbes estimated his net worth at US$1.03 billion; he had previously been ranked as high as 359 on the Forbes 400 in 2011.

Personal life
With his wife Jacque, he has three sons. Connor has a significant vintage car collection including a Ferrari 250 SWB and a 250 GTO and vintage Porsche and Alfa Romeos. Connor has competed in the Porsche Infineon Carrera Cup Asia and has provided Ferrari for the Le Mans 24 Hours race.

References

Living people
American billionaires
American businesspeople
American expatriates in Hong Kong
American car collectors
Stanford University alumni
Santa Clara University alumni
1949 births